CSLR may refer to:

 Centre scolaire Léo-Rémillard - a French high school situated south of Winnipeg, Manitoba, Canada
 City and South London Railway - the first deep-level underground "tube" railway in the world